Coleman is a city in Midland County of the U.S. state of Michigan. The population was 1,243 at the 2010 census.

History
Coleman began with the building of a sawmill in 1870. The following year a station of the Pere Marquette Railroad was opened. It was incorporated as a village in 1887 and as a city in 1905.

Geography

Demographics

2010 Census
As of the census of 2010, there were 1,243 people, 533 households, and 327 families residing in the city. The racial makeup of the city was 96.1% White, 0.7% African American, 0.3% Native American, 0.2% Asian, 0.1% Pacific Islander, 0.2% from other races, and 2.5% from two or more races. Hispanic or Latino of any race were 3.1% of the population.

There were 533 households, of which 31.0% had children under the age of 18 living with them, 41.7% were married couples living together, 14.1% had a female householder with no husband present, 5.6% had a male householder with no wife present, and 38.6% were non-families. 33.8% of all households were made up of individuals, and 13.9% had someone living alone who was 65 years of age or older. The average household size was 2.33 and the average family size was 2.99.

The median age in the city was 36.4 years. Of residents, 26.5% were under the age of 18; 8.8% were between the ages of 18 and 24; 24% were from 25 to 44; 23.3% were from 45 to 64; and 17.3% were 65 years of age or older. The gender makeup of the city was 47.9% male and 52.1% female.

2000 Census
As of the census of 2000, there were 1,296 people, 539 households, and 336 families residing in the city. The racial makeup of the city was 96.91% White, 0.08% African American, 1.47% Native American, 0.69% from other races, and 0.85% from two or more races. Hispanic or Latino of any race were 1.23% of the population.

There were 539 households, out of which 31.7% had children under the age of 18 living with them, 43.0% were married couples living together, 15.2% had a female householder with no husband present, and 37.5% were non-families. 31.7% of all households were made up of individuals, and 14.7% had someone living alone who was 65 years of age or older.  The average household size was 2.40 and the average family size was 3.00.

In the city, the population was spread out, with 27.8% under the age of 18, 10.1% from 18 to 24, 29.6% from 25 to 44, 17.7% from 45 to 64, and 14.8% who were 65 years of age or older. The median age was 34 years. For every 100 females, there were 88.6 males. For every 100 females age 18 and over, there were 82.1 males.

The median income for a household in the city was $28,750, and the median income for a family was $36,544. Males had a median income of $29,943 versus $21,719 for females. The per capita income for the city was $15,921. About 13.1% of families and 17.0% of the population were below the poverty line, including 24.8% of those under age 18 and 7.5% of those age 65 or over.

Highways

Notable People
 Virginia Harriett Kline (1910–1959), geologist, stratigrapher, and librarian, was born in Coleman
 Vern Ruhle (1951-2007), Major League Baseball pitcher, was born in Coleman

References

Notes

Sources

Cities in Midland County, Michigan
1887 establishments in Michigan
Populated places established in 1887